Grace Episocopal Church is an Episcopal church located in Mount Clemens, Michigan. It was designated a Michigan State Historic Site in 1975.

References

External links
 Official Website

Gothic Revival church buildings in Michigan
Churches completed in 1871
Michigan State Historic Sites
Episcopal church buildings in Michigan
19th-century Episcopal church buildings